Arthur Bardillon Robes is a Filipino politician and the current mayor of San Jose del Monte, Bulacan. Robes also served as the former Representative of the lone district of San Jose del Monte for three consecutive terms from 2007 to 2016. He is married to the current Representative of San Jose del Monte, Florida "Rida" Perez-Robes. Robes has a degree in Bachelor of Science in Commerce, major in Marketing at the San Sebastian College – Recoletos.

Education
Robes graduated from the San Sebastian College – Recoletos with a Bachelor of Science in Commerce, major in Marketing, in 1998. After graduating, he took up a Management course at the Asian Institute of Management and at the University of the Philippines, as well as an Executive Course at the Development Academy of the Philippines.

Political career
Robes is a member of the  PDP-Laban. He was first elected as representative of the lone district of San Jose del Monte in 2007, serving for three consecutive terms until 2016. During this time, he served as head of various committees, including the Committee on Women and Gender Equality, and Social Services.

In 2015, Robes was implicated in pork barrel scam allegations involving him and his wife, Florida. A whistleblower, Bernadette Ricalde, claimed that Florida Robes directed her to look for a foundation which can be used by then-Representative Robes to funnel funds into. These allegations came to light around the same time as the Priority Development Assistance Fund scam.

In the 2016 local elections, Robes ran and successfully won, defeating incumbent Reynaldo San Pedro. He was reelected in 2019.

References

People from San Jose del Monte
Living people
Liberal Party (Philippines) politicians
Members of the House of Representatives of the Philippines from San Jose del Monte
Mayors of places in Bulacan
San Sebastian College – Recoletos alumni
Year of birth missing (living people)